The kodjabashis (singular κοτζάμπασης, kotzabasis; ; from ) were local Christian notables in parts of the Ottoman Balkans, most often referring to Ottoman Greece and especially the Peloponnese. They were also known in Greek as proestoi or prokritoi (προεστοί/πρόκριτοι, "primates") or demogerontes (δημογέροντες, "elders of the people"). In some places they were elected (such in the islands for example), but, especially in the Peloponnese, they soon became a hereditary oligarchy, who exercised considerable influence and held posts in the Ottoman administration. 

The title was also present in Ottoman Serbia and Bosnia, where it was known as starešina ("elder, chief") instead of the official Turkish name. The terms chorbaji (from Turkish çorbacı) and knez (a Slavic title) were also used for this type of primates, in Bulgaria and Serbia respectively.

The equivalent of the kodjabashis in Orthodox villages was the mukhtar in Muslim villages, while mixed villages had both.

During the Greek War of Independence, the antagonism between the Peloponnesian kodjabashis, who sought to retain their previous preponderance and power, and the military leaders drawn from the klephts, was one of the main driving forces behind the outbreak of the Greek civil wars of 1824–1825, in which the "aristocratic" faction comprising the kodjabashis, the wealthy shipowners of Hydra and the Phanariotes, prevailed.

See also
Obor-knez
Rum Millet

References

Sources

Oligarchy
Ottoman Greece
Government of the Ottoman Empire
Turkish words and phrases
Christians from the Ottoman Empire
Ottoman titles
Ottoman-era Greek primates